Howard Township is one of eleven townships in Howard County, Indiana, United States. As of the 2010 census, its population was 2,579 and it contained 1,072 housing units.

History
Howard Township and Howard County are both named for Tilghman Howard, an Indiana congressman.

Geography

Unincorporated towns
 Cassville
 Vermont

Adjacent townships
 Clay Township, Miami County (north)
 Harrison Township, Miami County (northeast)
 Liberty Township (east)
 Taylor Township (south)
 Center Township (southwest)
 Clay Township (west)
 Deer Creek Township, Miami County (northwest)

Cemeteries
The township contains three cemeteries: Hopewell, Hudson and Salem.

Major highways
  U.S. Route 31
  U.S. Route 35

Airports and landing strips
 Kokomo Municipal Airport
 Medallion Field

References
 
 United States Census Bureau cartographic boundary files

External links
 Indiana Township Association
 United Township Association of Indiana

Townships in Howard County, Indiana
Kokomo, Indiana metropolitan area
Townships in Indiana